On 8 December 2000, Irishman Trevor Deely disappeared in Dublin. He had been walking home around 4am from his office's Christmas party, and had needed to go to the bank, where he worked, to retrieve an umbrella as well as to get certain things in order for his shift the next day. He was seen on a security camera at his bank and in front of another bank he passed as he headed home on foot; both also captured a man clad in dark clothing who has yet to be identified and is considered likely to have played a role in Deely's disappearance.

Background
Trevor Deely was born on 15 August 1978. His parents are Michael and Ann Deely. He is the youngest of four siblings. He grew up in Naas, County Kildare, in Ireland. After finishing school, Deely studied business at the Waterford Institute of Technology but dropped out in his second year. He subsequently completed a computer course in Dublin. In May 1999, he began working in the IT department of Bank of Ireland Asset Management on Leeson Street.

In late November 2000, just weeks before his disappearance, Deely flew to Alaska in the United States. He flew on a discount that his friend procured for him due to his role as a long-haul flight attendant, which his friend described as ‘free’. He went over to see a girl that he had met in Dublin during the summer while she was holidaying in Ireland.

Disappearance
The Christmas party was scheduled for Thursday 7 December. After drinks in Copper Face Jacks and the Hilton Hotel, the party moved to Buck Whaley's nightclub on Lower Leeson Street. Deely left Buck Whaley's at about 3:25am. He started walking in the direction of his apartment in the Renoir complex, on Serpentine Avenue in Ballsbridge. There was a heavy storm that night with gusts as high as 60 or 70 mph, and there was also a taxi strike. About ten minutes after leaving the nightclub, Deely arrived at his office, and was let in after calling security. While in his office Deely made a cup of tea and spoke to a colleague, Karl Pender, who was working the night shift. He also checked his emails and made a note of things he needed to do in work the following morning. He left the office at 4:03am, taking an umbrella with him, and continued in the direction of Ballsbridge. Around this time he rang a friend of his in Naas and left a voicemail. His friend described the message as saying "‘Hi, Glen, I’ve missed you there. Just on my way home, all going good, I’ll talk to you tomorrow.’ Or words to that very close effect.” His friend deleted the message, not regarding it as significant and investigators never sought to retrieve it.

CCTV footage shows that a man dressed in black was waiting outside the gates of the bank for approximately half an hour before Deely arrived. When Deely arrived, they had a brief conversation. Two minutes after Deely entered the bank, two more men arrived at the gate. While they have since been cleared as colleagues of Deely, the man in black remains a person of interest. By the time Deely left the bank, this man was no longer waiting outside.

At 4:14am CCTV footage shows Deely walking past what was then the AIB bank on the corner of Baggot Street Bridge and Haddington Road in the direction of his flat. About thirty seconds later a man dressed in black passed by the AIB bank. Gardaí said that they believe this is the same man who spoke to Deely outside his office. This man has never come forward to Gardaí, despite numerous appeals over many years since the disappearance. This footage represents the last known sighting of Deely.

Investigation
Deely's absence from work the following morning was not seen as a cause for concern as it had been a late night. Additionally, his flatmates were away that weekend so they did not know he was missing either. Only when Deely failed to show up the following Monday were alarm bells raised. His work informed his family. After ascertaining that nobody had spoken to Deely that weekend, they reported him as a missing person.

Over the following days Deely's family and friends put up hundreds of posters, handed out thousands of leaflets and went from house to house and business to business inquiring if people had seen him. His friends were able to obtain the CCTV footage used in the investigation. Det. Sgt Michael Fitzgerald, who worked on the case from the beginning said “I’ve never worked on a case where the family were so proactive.” The delay between Deely being last seen and reported as missing meant that vital time was lost.

The Garda sub-aqua team searched the river Dodder and the Grand Canal but did not find anything. They were unable to drain the Grand Canal Basin as it would affect the structural integrity of the surrounding buildings. Deely's sister, Michele, said that she rang his phone a few times the weekend he went missing and she believes that it rang out. According to Dr. Philip Perry, a senior research fellow in the radio and optical communications laboratory at Dublin City University, a phone in 2000 would have gone dead within seconds of falling into the water. However, Michele said she is not 100% sure that it did actually ring.

Two Gardaí travelled to Alaska to speak to the girl who Deely had gone over to see before his disappearance. Deely's sisters also travelled to Alaska separately for the same purpose. The trips did not produce any leads.

Later developments
Deely's whereabouts remain unknown and the case continues to spark interest. A special documentary hosted by Donal MacIntyre aired on TV3 in 2015.

In December 2016 a new investigation was opened. The following April, enhanced CCTV footage was released, leading to the announcement by Gardaí that they believed that the man dressed in black seen behind Deely on the Haddington Road footage was the same man that he spoke to outside his office. That same month a €100,000 reward was offered for information.

In August 2017, Gardaí began a search of a three-acre secluded area in the Dublin suburb of Chapelizod, about 8 kilometres from where Deely was last seen. An informant alleged that Deely was murdered on the night of his disappearance by a Crumlin-based criminal known to Gardaí. The gang he was in was involved in the drugs and prostitution trade in the area where Deely disappeared. The same gang was investigated for the murder of Sinead Kelly in June 1998. The informant said that Deely and his alleged murderer had not known each other and it was a chance encounter. Although a gun and drugs were found during the search, investigators concluded that they were not related to the case, calling the site a 'stash area' for criminals. The search was called off in September and Gardaí said at the time that they had not found anything that would assist them in the case.

See also
List of people who disappeared

References

External links

2000 in the Republic of Ireland
2000s missing person cases
Missing person cases in Ireland
People from Naas
People from Ballsbridge